Pish Khowr Rural District is a rural district (dehestan) in Pish Khowr District, Famenin County, Hamadan Province, Iran. At the 2006 census, its population was 4,327, in 1,141 families. The rural district has 31 villages.

References 

Rural Districts of Hamadan Province
Famenin County